Here are the list of the video games those were published or distributed by THQ.

Published titles

Distributed titles

Notes

References 

THQ